Sheepdog of the Hills is a 1941 British drama film directed by Germain Burger and starring David Farrar, Philip Friend and Helen Perry. The screenplay concerns an outbreak of sheep-stealing that occurs in a small rural community in the West Country.

Cast
 David Farrar ...  Rev. Michael Verney
 Philip Friend ...  Dr. Peter Hammond
 Helen Perry ...  Frances Miller
 Dennis Wyndham ...  Riggy Teasdale
 Leonard Sharp ...  Geordie Scott
 Jack Vyvian ...  Constable Scott
 Arthur Denton ...  Hawkins
 Philip Godfrey ...  Sam Worrow
 Johnnie Schofield ...  Tom Abbott

References

External links

1941 films
1941 drama films
Films about sheep
British drama films
British black-and-white films
1940s English-language films
1940s British films